Leukotriene receptor antagonist-associated Churg–Strauss syndrome may occur in asthma patients being treated with leukotriene receptor antagonists, occurring 2 days to 10 months after the antagonist has been started, with features of the syndrome including peripheral eosinophilia, pulmonary infiltrates, and less commonly neuropathy, sinusitis, and cardiomyopathy.

See also
Eosinophilic granulomatosis with polyangiitis (Churg-Strauss syndrome)
Leukotriene antagonist
Skin lesion

References

External links 

Drug eruptions
Syndromes